United Nations Security Council resolution 1068, adopted unanimously on 30 July 1996, after recalling previous resolutions on Israel and Lebanon including 501 (1982), 508 (1982), 509 (1982) and 520 (1982) as well as studying the report by the Secretary-General Boutros Boutros-Ghali on the United Nations Interim Force in Lebanon (UNIFIL) approved in 426 (1978), the Council decided to extend the mandate of UNIFIL for a further six months until 31 January 1997.

The Council then reemphasised the mandate of the Force and requested the Secretary-General to continue negotiations with the Government of Lebanon and other parties concerned with regard to the implementation of resolutions 425 (1978) and 426 (1978) and report thereon.

The completion of streamlining measures concerning UNIFIL was welcomed and further savings were encouraged, but noting that the operational capacity of the Force should not be affected.

See also 
 List of United Nations Security Council Resolutions 1001 to 1100 (1995–1997)
 South Lebanon conflict (1985–2000)

References

External links
 
Text of the Resolution at undocs.org

 1068
 1068
 1068

1996 in Israel
1996 in Lebanon
July 1996 events
South Lebanon conflict (1985–2000)